Stidzaeras is a genus of moths in the family Erebidae.

Species
 Stidzaeras evora Druce, 1906
 Stidzaeras strigifera Druce, 1905

References

Natural History Museum Lepidoptera generic names catalog

Phaegopterina
Moth genera